Eland Oil & Gas PLC is a Nigeria focused upstream oil and natural gas exploration and production company listed on the AIM in London with operational offices in Abuja, Nigeria and Aberdeen, Scotland.

History

The Company was founded in 2009 with the vision and strategy to become a high growth Nigeria focused independent exploration and production company.
 
Concurrent with the initial public offering in September 2012, Eland purchased a 45% interest in OML 40, with its partner Starcrest Energy Nigeria Limited, from the Shell Group.

Operations

The focus in 2012/2013 was 1) to restart shut-in production on OML 40 through existing production facilities, 2) to commission a new CPR (Competent Persons Report), and 3) to commence drilling of new development wells through a long term drilling programme.

OML 40

There is low risk appraisal upside and substantial exploration potential.

In 2006, SPDC undertook a controlled shutdown of certain of SPDC’s assets in the Niger Delta, including OML 40, as they were unable to continue to operate these assets due to security problems. Eland considers the security issues that prevented SPDC from producing from the OML 40 Lease area in March 2006 to be regional, not specific to the licence area, and substantially mitigated by the federal Government Amnesty programme in 2009, which offered unemployed youths from the Niger Delta the opportunity to train for employment in the oil and gas industry by way of Government sponsored schemes.

Nigerian crude is a high quality, light oil grade referred to as “Sweet”, which trades at a premium to Brent because of its high gasoline content and relatively low processing costs.

References

External links
Eland Oil & Gas Official Website

Oil and gas companies of the United Kingdom